The Democratic Renewal of Macedonia (Demokratska obnova na Makedonija) is a green-liberal political party in North Macedonia. This party actively promotes the green idea for North Macedonia. DOM's political objectives are: green jobs, renewable energy, human rights, democracy, ecology, tourism, eco-agriculture, women empowerment, culture, more funds for science and education.  
At their first elections, 5 July 2006, the party won 1.9% and 1 out of 120 seats. From 2008, DOM is part of Coalition run by Macedonia ruling party VMRO-DPMNE. In the parliamentary elections 2008 and 2011 DOM as part of the Coalition won 1 seat. 2016 DOM was part of the SDSM-led "For life in Macedonia" and won 1 seat.

External links
Official website

2006 establishments in the Republic of Macedonia
Centrist parties in North Macedonia
European Green Party
Green parties in Europe
Liberal parties in North Macedonia
Political parties established in 2006